Benjamin Franklin Bledsoe (February 8, 1874 – October 30, 1938) was a United States district judge of the United States District Court for the Southern District of California.

Education and career

Born in San Bernardino, California, Bledsoe received an Artium Baccalaureus degree from Stanford University in 1896, and read law to enter the bar. He was in private practice in San Bernardino from 1896 to 1910. He was a Judge of the California Superior Court from 1900 to 1914.

Federal judicial service

On September 30, 1914, Bledsoe was nominated by President Woodrow Wilson to a new seat on the United States District Court for the Southern District of California created by 38 Stat. 580. He was confirmed by the United States Senate on October 16, 1914, and received his commission the same day. He resigned on March 24, 1925.

Notable case

Bledsoe heard the case of Robert Goldstein who produced The Spirit of '76, a patriotic film about the American Revolution. Released just as World War I was starting federal censors required depictions of British atrocities to be cut. Goldstein was tried after an uncut version was shown. Bledsoe sentenced him to 10 years in prison and the media and public opinion turned harshly against him despite initially favorable reviews. Goldstein's sentence was commuted after three years but he was never able to clear his name.

Later career and death

Bledsoe resigned from the federal bench to run for Mayor of Los Angeles, California, but was unsuccessful in that bid. He returned to private practice in Los Angeles from 1925 until his death on October 30, 1938, in Crestline, California.
Bledsoe was a life member of the Society of Colonial Wars, admitted to membership December 6, 1919. Membership No. 6010, California Society No. 194.

References

Sources
 

1874 births
1938 deaths
Judges of the United States District Court for the Southern District of California
United States district court judges appointed by Woodrow Wilson
20th-century American judges
Stanford University alumni
People from San Bernardino, California
United States federal judges admitted to the practice of law by reading law

California of the South Vol. II, by John Steven McGroarty, Pages 493-495, Clarke Publ., Chicago, Los Angeles,  Indianapolis.  1933.